Ding Liren (born 24 October 1992) is a Chinese chess grandmaster. He is the highest rated Chinese chess player in history and is also a three-time Chinese Chess Champion. He was the winner of the 2019 Grand Chess Tour, beating Maxime Vachier-Lagrave in the finals and winning the 2019 Sinquefield Cup, as the first player since 2007 to beat Magnus Carlsen in a playoff. Ding is the first Chinese player ever to play in a Candidates Tournament and pass the 2800 Elo mark on the FIDE world rankings. In July 2016, with a Blitz rating of 2875, he was the highest rated Blitz player in the world.

Ding was undefeated in classical chess from August 2017 to November 2018, recording 29 victories and 71 draws. This 100-game unbeaten streak was the longest in top-level chess history, until Magnus Carlsen surpassed it in 2019. Ding is currently No. 3 in classical chess behind Magnus Carlsen and Ian Nepomniachtchi, and will be one of the challengers for the upcoming World Chess Championship 2023 (having qualified as Carlsen declined to defend his title).

Education 
Ding attended Chant Garden Elementary School and is a graduate of Zhejiang Wenzhou High School and Peking University Law School.

Career

Ding is a three-time Chinese Chess Champion (2009, 2011, 2012) and has represented China at all four Chess Olympiads from 2012 to 2018, winning team gold medals in 2014 and 2018 and individual bronze and gold medals in 2014 and 2018 respectively. He also won team gold and individual silver at the World Team Championships in 2015.

In August 2015, he became the second Chinese player after Wang Yue to break into the top 10 of the FIDE world rankings. In July 2016, with a Blitz rating of 2875, he was the highest rated Blitz player in the world.

In September 2017, he became the first Chinese player to qualify for a Candidates Tournament, the penultimate stage in the World Championship. At the Candidates Tournament 2018 he placed 4th with 1 win and 13 draws, the only candidate without a loss at the event.

In September 2018, Ding became the first Chinese player to pass the 2800 Elo mark on the FIDE world rankings, and in November he reached a rating of 2816, the joint-tenth highest rating in history.

In August 2019, he won the Sinquefield Cup, with 2 wins and 9 draws, beating reigning World Champion Magnus Carlsen in the playoffs.

In October of the same year, Ding qualified for the Candidates Tournament 2020–21 by finishing 2nd place in the World Cup for the second time in a row. However, he had a poor start to the Candidates tournament, and finished in a tie for 5th and 6th.

Along with Magnus Carlsen, Maxime Vachier-Lagrave, and Levon Aronian, he was a 2019 Grand Chess Tour finalist. Ding went on to win the Grand Chess Tour final, beating Aronian in the semifinals and Vachier-Lagrave in the finals.

After Sergey Karjakin was disqualified from the Candidates Tournament 2022, Ding was the highest player on the ratings list who was not already qualified. Ding had been unable to travel to tournaments outside China during the COVID-19 pandemic, and was thus short of the minimum games requirement for qualification, but the Chinese Chess Association organized three different rated events at short notice to allow him to qualify. At the tournament itself, he achieved second place, rebounding from a slow start to end up with 4 wins, 8 draws and 2 losses. Because reigning champion Magnus Carlsen declined to defend his title against Ian Nepomniachtchi, the winner of the 2022 Candidates, Ding's second place spot qualified him to play Nepomniachtchi in the World Chess Championship 2023 instead. In 2023 he played at the Tata Steel Chess Tournament 2023, where he lost to Richárd Rapport, R Praggnanandhaa, and Anish Giri; these losses dropped his rating below 2800, leaving only Magnus Carlsen to retain a rating above 2800.

Results 
November 2003: U-10 World Youth Championship in Heraklio, joint 1st on 9/11 points with Eltaj Safarli, 2nd on tiebreak
November 2004: U-12 World Youth Championship in Heraklio, joint 1st on 9/11 points with Zhao Nan, 2nd on tiebreak
April 2004: Chinese Men's Team Championship in Jinan, scored 1/4
July 2005: Chinese Individual Championship in Hefei,
April 2007: Zonal Tournament 3.5 (China) in Dezhou, scored 6/9
July 2007: Chinese Men's Championship Individual Group B in Zhuhai, scored 7/10
May 2008: Chinese Individual Championship in Beijing, scored 5/11 finishing 6th
June 2008: Men's Selective Tournament for Olympiad in Ningbo, scored 4/10
July 2008: Czech Open 2008 MS U14 U16 – M-silnice Open in Pardubice, scored 5/5
April 2009: Men's Zonal Tournament 3.5 (China) in Beijing, scored 5/11
May 2009: 8th Asian Continental Individual Open Championship in Subic Bay Freeport, scored 6/11 (first grandmaster norm)
May 2009: Chinese Individual Championship in Xinghua, Jiangsu, 1st with 8/11 and 2800+ TPR (second GM norm)
August 2009: Russia – China (men) in Dagomys, scored 2/5
September 2009: Chinese Chess King in Jinzhou, scored 3/7
October 2009, he became China's 30th grandmaster. 
April 2011: Chinese Individual Championship in Xinghua, Jiangsu, 1st with 9/11
Chess World Cup 2011: knocked out by Wesley So
April 2012: Chinese Individual Championship in Xinghua, Jiangsu, 1st with 8/11
October 2012: SPICE Cup in St. Louis, tied for 2nd with 5/10
In the 2013 Alekhine Memorial tournament, held from 20 April to 1 May, Liren finished ninth, with +1−3=5.
March - April 2017: Won the Longgang Shenzhen Grandmaster Tournament.
May 2017: Won the Moscow Grand Prix with 6/9 
September 2017: Reached the final of the 2017 Chess World Cup. This qualified him for the Candidates Tournament, the first Chinese player to do so. He subsequently lost on tiebreak in the final to Levon Aronian.
March 2018: Candidates Tournament 2018, Berlin. Placed clear 4th with +1−0=13, the only candidate without a loss at the event.
April 2018: Shamkir Chess 2018, finished 2nd with 5/9 (+2–0=7).
August 2019: He finished second place in the Saint Louis Rapid and Blitz event with a score of 21/36. The second place was tied and shared with Yu Yangyi and Maxime Vachier-Lagrave. 
August 2019: Ding Liren won the 2019 Sinquefield Cup by beating Magnus Carlsen in both blitz tiebreak games after drawing both rapid tiebreak games; both Ding and Carlsen scored 6/11 (+2–0=9) in the classical games.
December 2019: Ding Liren won the Grand Chess Tour Finals by beating Levon Aronian in the semifinals and Maxime Vachier-Lagrave in the finals.
March 2020 and April 2021: Ding Liren played in the Candidates Tournament for the right to face Magnus Carlsen for the World Chess Championship. He got off to a slow start, losing his first two games but finished the tournament with three straight wins to finish in 5th place.  His final win was with the white pieces over the tournament winner, Ian Nepomniachtchi.
 June–July 2021: Finished in 4th place in the Goldmoney Asian Rapid tournament.  He was one of eight players to advance to the knockout stage of the tournament after a 3rd-place finish in the round-robin phase of the tournament.  Defeated Jan-Krzysztof Duda 1- in the quarterfinals before losing to Vladislav Artemiev in the semifinals 2–1. He lost to Magnus Carlsen in the 3rd place match.
 December 2021: Ding was a semi-finalist at the 2021 Speed Chess Championship, losing the tiebreaker game to GM Hikaru Nakamura after a four-hour back-and-forth struggle.
 May 2022: Ding won the 2022 Chessable Masters after defeating Magnus Carlsen in the semifinals and R Praggnanandhaa in the finals.
 July 2022: Finished second at the Candidates Tournament 2022 with a score 8/14, by beating GM Hikaru Nakamura in the last round.

References

Further reading 
16-year-old Ding Liren Wins Chinese Ch
Ding Liren wins the Chinese Chess Championship  (Chessdom)
Ding Liren (16) new Chinese Champion after surreal finish (ChessVibes)
Chinese Championship – a closer look at Ding Liren (ChessBase)
The Chess Mind (Dennis Monokroussos)
Ding Liren champion de Chine! (Europe Echecs)
Feedback and facts on FIDE's 'zero tolerance' rule
Chinese Championship – decision by default
Ding Liren won the 15th National Children's Chess Championship (in Chinese)
Ding Liren: The First Chint Class of Character and Excellent Students  (in Chinese)

External links 
 
 
 
 

1992 births
Living people
Sportspeople from Wenzhou
Chess grandmasters
Chess players from Zhejiang
Peking University alumni